Lukáš Klimeš (born 14 July 1994) is a Czech professional ice hockey goalie. He is currently playing for HC Kometa Brno of the Czech Extraliga (ELH).

Klimeš made his Czech Extraliga debut playing with HC Kometa Brno during the 2014-15 Czech Extraliga season.

Career statistics

Regular season and playoffs

References

External links

1994 births
Living people
HC Kometa Brno players
HC ZUBR Přerov players
Czech ice hockey goaltenders
Ice hockey people from Brno
BK Havlíčkův Brod players
SK Horácká Slavia Třebíč players